Unione Sportiva Bitonto is an Italian association football club located in Bitonto, Apulia. Its colors are black and green.

Bitonto were promoted for the first time in history to Serie C in 2019–20 as champions of Serie D, following the early conclusion of the league due to the COVID-19 pandemic.

References

External links
 Official homepage

Football clubs in Apulia
Bitonto
Association football clubs established in 1921
1921 establishments in Italy